At the 2006 South Asian Games, the athletics events were held at the Sugathadasa Stadium in Colombo, Sri Lanka from 23 August to 27 August 2006. A total of 35 events were contested, of which 20 by male and 15 by female athletes.

India was the most successful country, medals-wise, with a total of 43 medals, 15 of which were gold. The hosts Sri Lanka were the next best medal winner, having taken 14 gold medals. A total of 5 Games records were broken during the competition, which included world medallist Anju Bobby George's performance of 6.42 metres in the long jump. Susanthika Jayasinghe completed a 100 and 200 metres double, before going on to take the gold with the Sri Lankan relay team. Her male counterpart Rohan Pradeep Kumara achieved a similar feat, winning the 200 and 400 metres races, as well at the 400 m relay. Pinki Pramanik of India was another athlete to win two golds as she won the women's 400 and 800 metres finals.

Rajendra Bhandari of Nepal won a 5000 metres and 3000 metres steeplechase double, but his sample delivered at the Games tested positive for Norandrosterone. He was disqualified from the event and banned from competing for two years. Jani Chathurangani Silva, the 100 m silver medallist, was also banned for Norandrosterone.

Records

Medal summary
Key

Men

Women

Doping in Athletics at the 2006 South Asian Games

Updated Medal Summary after Doping test results (Medal Upgrade)

Medal table

Note: Table has been adjusted to discount medals by athletes who failed drugs tests

See also 

 Doping at the 2006 South Asian Games

References
General
Athletics results. SAF Games 2006. Retrieved on 2010-03-04.
Weerawansa, Dinesh (2006-08-24). Jayasinghe back with 22.99 to win South Asian Games 200m - Day 1. IAAF. Retrieved on 2010-03-04.
Weerawansa, Dinesh (2006-08-25). South Asian Games – Day 2. IAAF. Retrieved on 2010-03-04.
Weerawansa, Dinesh (2006-08-26). South Asian Games – Day 3. IAAF. Retrieved on 2010-03-04.
Weerawansa, Dinesh (2006-08-27). Marathon ends South Asian Games – Final day. IAAF. Retrieved on 2010-03-04.
Specific

External links
Official Games website

2006 South Asian Games
South Asian Games
2006 South Asian Games